Robert Coupland Harding (19 October 1849 – 16 December 1916) was a New Zealand printer, typographer and journalist. He was born in Wellington, New Zealand on 19 October 1849.

References

1849 births
1916 deaths
New Zealand journalists
New Zealand typographers and type designers
People from Wellington City